Drew Van Horn (born May, 1960) is an American college president and administrator. He is the 23rd president of Young Harris College in Young Harris, Georgia invested in October, 2017. He previously served as President of Brevard College from 2002 through 2011 and a vice president at several other colleges.

Education
Van Horn graduated from East Burke High School in Icard, North Carolina in 1978. He attended Elon College in Elon, North Carolina on a basketball scholarship.

Van Horn earned a bachelor's degree cum laude in human service studies from Elon in 1982; the following year he received a master's degree in counseling from Campbell University; and an educational Doctorate from the University of South Carolina in 2002.

Professional

Elon
Following graduate school, Van Horn returned to Elon College as director of Student activities. After 3 years at Elon he left to join the Fellowship of Christian Athletes as assistant state director in North Carolina for 3 years before returning to Elon where he was Director of Alumni and Parent Relations, then Director of Development and Major Gifts.
 
From mid-1995 to the end of 1996 he worked for the Independent College Fund of North Carolina as executive director. At the ICFNC Van Horn developed and executed a yearly fundraising plan; lobbied the North Carolina General Assembly; recruited and trained members of their Board of Directors and the Presidents from North Carolina's 27 member colleges and universities as volunteer funding solicitors; and decreased the cost of fundraising while increasing contributions.

He was at Gardner-Webb University from 1996 to 2002 as vice president for University Relations and Advancement. During that time, he secured grants from the Kresge Foundation and Lilly Endowment; completed a $30 million capital campaign titled, Dreaming, Daring and Doing and nearly doubled the annual giving program.

Brevard
Dr. Van Horn assumed the Presidency of Brevard College in 2002. During his eight-plus years at Brevard, he increased freshman student enrollment by nearly half, increased student retention significantly, conducted the school's first-ever capital campaign that generated  $19 million, and created three new academic majors. He also oversaw the school's conversion to NCAA Division II athletics from NAIA with membership in the South Atlantic Conference.

On February 1, 2011, Van Horn announced his resignation from Brevard College effective May 31, giving the school time to transition a replacement.

Post Brevard
After leaving Brevard, he established Decision-matters, LLC, a consulting firm for leadership development and training. Beginning in 2012, he spent more than four years at Lenoir–Rhyne University as VP of institutional advancement where he successfully managed their $65 million fundraising campaign. He left Hickory, NC to take the same position on an interim basis at Iowa Wesleyan University where he created a capital campaign while managing public and internal relations.

Young Harris   
Young Harris College inducted him as college president in 2017.

Honors
During his years at Elon, Van Horn was inducted into the Omicron Delta Kappa leadership and Alpha Chi academic honor societies.

Van Horn was selected as a CoSIDA (GTE) Academic All-American in basketball two years running (1981-1982). In 2005 he was inducted into the Athletic Hall of Fame at Elon University.
 
Elon College honored Van Horn with their Distinguished Alumni award on May 2, 2022. Those honored have established "careers of excellence in their fields with a commitment to Elon’s values of integrity, honesty, service and leadership."

In October 2022 Georgia Governor Brian Kemp appointed Van Horn to the board of the Georgia Nonpublic Postsecondary Education Commission. Eleven members sit on the board, each of whom is appointed by the Governor and confirmed by the Georgia Senate. Each member may serve up to (two) three-year terms.

Civic Involvement
Van Horn has also worked with service organizations in the communities where he lived, helping them form fundraising plans and strategic goals. He was selected as a Thrivent Leadership Program Fellow.

Throughout his career, Van Horn has been active in civic leadership. He is a member of Rotary International and has worked with numerous county and regional organizations wherever he resided.

Personal
Van Horn is married to his wife, Camille. They have two adult children, Julia and Jackson.

External links
Office of President Young Harris College
Georgia Nonpublic Postsecondary Education Commission
East Burke High School alumni letter

References

Elon University alumni
Campbell University alumni
University of South Carolina alumni
Heads of universities and colleges in the United States
Living people
1960 births
People from Burke County, North Carolina
People from Towns County, Georgia
Brevard College
Young Harris College
Elon Phoenix men's basketball players